Oliver Bailey Garver Jr. (July 19, 1925 - August 2, 1996) was a suffragan bishop of the Episcopal Diocese of Los Angeles, serving from 1985 to 1990. He conferred Holy Order on Philip Lance, the first openly gay priest in The Episcopal Church, in January 1988. Lance's ordination was contested by members of the Commission on Ministry but Garver and Bishop Jon Bruno advocated for his approval.

External links 
Oliver Garver, Retired Church Official, Dies
Obituary -- Oliver Bailey Garver, Jr.

1925 births
1996 deaths
20th-century American Episcopalians
Episcopal bishops of Los Angeles
20th-century American clergy